Min-a-he-quo-sis 116C is an Indian reserve of the Little Pine First Nation in Saskatchewan. It is 45 kilometres northwest of North Battleford. In the 2016 Canadian Census, it recorded a population of 0 living in 0 of its 0 total private dwellings.

References

Indian reserves in Saskatchewan